The following is a list of former Ministers of Culture and Tourism of Turkey.

References

Culture and Tourism
Turkey
Turkey